Västerås Municipality (Västerås kommun) is a municipality in Västmanland County in central Sweden. Its seat is located in the city of Västerås.

The municipality prefers to use the denomination Västerås stad (City of Västerås) for the whole territory, including rural areas.

The municipality evolved gradually during the municipal reforms in Sweden.  Most of the amalgamations took place in 1967 and the municipality in its present form was created in 1971. There are 30 original local government units within the present municipality.

Localities 
As of 2018, there were 17 localities in the municipality:

International relations

Twin towns — Sister cities
Västerås is twinned with:

References

External links

 Västerås Municipality - Official site

Västerås
Municipalities of Västmanland County
fi:Västerås